Zuyev, sometimes spelled as Zuev, or Zuyeva (feminine; Зуева), is a Russian last name derived from the word зуй (zooy, meaning ). It may refer to:

 Aleksandr Zuyev (footballer, born 26 June 1996), Russian football player
 Aleksandr Zuyev (footballer, born 2 June 1996), Russian football player
Aleksandr Zuyev (pilot) (1961-2001), a captain of the former Soviet Air Force, who piloted his Mikoyan MiG-29 to Turkey in 1989
Aleksei Zuev (b. 1981), a Russian football (soccer) goalkeeper
Alexei Zuev (pianist), born 28 April 1982 in Leningrad (St. Petersburg), a Russian pianist
Alexei Zuyev (1922-1952), a Soviet army officer and Hero of the Soviet Union
Anastasia Zuyeva (b. 1990), 2008 European champion in the 50 and 100 backstroke from Russia.
Anastasia Zuyeva (1896-1986), a Russian/Soviet actress and People's Artist of the USSR
Gavriil Zuyev (1907-1974), a Soviet aircraft pilot and Hero of the Soviet Union
Kuzma Zuyev (1914-1978), a Soviet soldier and Hero of the Soviet Union
Ludmila Zueva (born 1973), a Russia marketer
Mikhail Zuyev (1918-1981), a Soviet aircraft pilot and Hero of the Soviet Union

Sergei Zuev, the owner of the Three Whales (Tri kita) furniture retail center in Moscow arrested in 2006 during the investigation of the Three Whales Corruption Scandal.
Vasily Zuyev (1754-1794), a Russian naturalist, explorer, and academician
Viktar Zuyev (b. 1983), a Belarusian heavyweight boxer
Vladimir Zuev (physicist) (1925-2003), a Soviet physicist
Vladimir Zuev (b. 1985), a Ukrainian ice dancer
Yury Zuev (1932-2006), a Russian sinologist and turkologist

See also 
 Orekhovo-Zuyevo

Russian-language surnames